Kist or KIST may refer to:

Abbreviations
 Kigali Institute of Science and Technology, a former university in Kigali, Rwanda, now part of the new University of Rwanda
K. International School in Tokyo, Japan
Konark Institute of Science and Technology, a multi-disciplinary institute in Bhubaneswar, Orissa, India
 Korea Institute of Science and Technology, a multi-disciplinary research institute in Seoul, South Korea

Boxes
 Cist, an ancient stone burial box, also spelt kist
 Kist, a word of Scots origin for a chest (furniture)

Radio
 KCLU (AM), a radio station (1340 AM) in Santa Barbara, California, US, which formerly held the call sign KIST for several periods until July 2008
 KSPE, a radio station (1490 AM) in Santa Barbara, California, US, which held the call sign KIST from October 2008 to July 2010
 KIST-FM, a radio station (107.7 FM) in Carpinteria, California, US

Other uses
 Kist, Germany, a small town close to Würzburg in Germany
 Kist people, a Nakh-speaking ethnic group in the country of Georgia related to the Chechen and Ingush peoples
 Kist (brand), a defunct soda brand

See also
 Gold Kist, a chicken-producing company in the United States